Brian James Sullivan (born March 26, 1958) is an American politician, serving as the Snohomish County Treasurer.

Background
Born in Butte, Montana, Sullivan graduated from Mariner High School in Everett, Washington and then studied political science at Central Washington University and University of Washington. He worked for a local planning agency: Snohomish County Tomorrow and owned a small business in Mukilteo, Washington. Sullivan served on the Mukilteo City Council from 1986 to 1989 and then Mayor of Mukilteo from 1990 to 1997. From 2001 to 2007, Sullivan served in the Washington House of Representatives as a Democrat.

In 2007, Sullivan was elected to the Snohomish County Council.

He ran for mayor of Everett in 2017, but finished third in the primary behind Cassie Franklin and Judy Tuohy.

In 2019 he ran for and was elected Snohomish County Treasurer. His seat on the county council was won by Megan Dunn.

References

External links
Snohomish County, Washington Government-District 2-Brian Sullivan

1958 births
Living people
Mayors of places in Washington (state)
Democratic Party members of the Washington House of Representatives
Snohomish County Councillors
Washington (state) city council members
Politicians from Butte, Montana
Politicians from Everett, Washington
Central Washington University alumni
University of Washington alumni
Businesspeople from Washington (state)
People from Mukilteo, Washington